The Living Standards Measure or LSM is a marketing and research tool ( same as social economic class: SEC but more refine ) used in South Africa to classify standard of living and disposable income. It segments the population into ten deciles based on their relative means, with LSM 1 being the decile with the least means and 10 being the decile with the greatest means. It does this by ranking people based on ownership of the components of a standard basket of goods (which varies over time). For instance, those people who owned a television set would rank higher in the LSM than those who did not.

In effect, the LSM is an income inequality metric, despite specifically excluding income as one of the tested metric. Its components are reflective of the fact that South Africa has a high Gini coefficient.

Current Variables 
The current (2015) basket of variables used to calculate LSM is:
 Metropolitan dweller (250 000+)
 Living in a non-urban area		
 House / Cluster House / Town House		
 Tap water in house / on plot		
 Flush Toilet inside house		
 Hot running water		
 Built in Kitchen Sink
 No Domestic Workers or Gardeners
 Home security service		
 2 Cellphones in Household
 3 or more Cellphones in Household
 Zero or One Radio set in Household
 Air conditioner (excl. fans)
 Television set(s)
 Swimming Pool
 DVD Player / Blu Ray Player
 Refrigerator or combined fridge/freezer
 Electric Stove
 Microwave oven
 Deep Freezer - Free Standing
 Washing machine
 Tumble dryer
 Dishwasher
 PayTV (M-net / DSTV / TopTV) Subscription
 Home Theatre System
 Vacuum Cleaner
 Motor Vehicle in Household
 Computer - Desktop / Laptop
 Land line telephone (excl. Cellphone)

See also 
 LSM Calculator

References

Market segmentation
Standard of living
Income inequality metrics